Poompavai is a 1944 Indian Tamil-language film directed by T. Balaji Singh and the duo Krishnan–Panju in the latter's directorial debut. Produced under the banner of Leo Films, it features K. R. Ramaswamy, U. R. Jeevarathnam, K. Sarangapani, K. R. Chellam and S. V. Sahasranamam. The film was released in August 1944 and became a success.

Plot 
Poompavai is the daughter of Sivanesan Chettiar, a jeweller based in Mylai. Her cruel stepmother Ponnammal despises her and plots against her. Poompavai devotes herself to worshipping the Hindu god Shiva. One day, Shiva appears before her father in the guise of a sadhu, and gives him a ruby, which he decides to embed in a crown that the chieftain of Mylai has ordered him to make. But to his dismay, Sivanesan realises that his daughter has already given the ruby to a sadhu seeking alms. The chieftain refuses to believe this, and banishes Sivanesan and his family.

The banished family meet Thirugnanar Sambandar, a saint to whom Poompavai is attracted. However, he orders her not to indulge in such desires and instead seek divine knowledge. After learning of Sambandar's powers, the chieftain of Mylai forgives Sivanesan's family and reinstates them. Not too long after, Poompavai dies after being bitten by a snake. A shocked Sivanesan rushes to Sambandar, who successfully resurrects her. Poompavai again asks him to marry her, but Sambandar says that having given her life, he is now like her father. Instead, he gives her divine knowledge, so she becomes his devotee.

Cast 

Male cast
 K. R. Ramaswamy as Thirugnanar Sambandar
 K. Sarangapani as Sivanesan Chettiar
 T. R. Ramachandran as Elelasingan
 Sahasranamam as Lord Shiva
 M. R. Durairaj as Sivapadahrithayar
 K. P. Jayaraman as Fat Chetty
 D. Balasubramaniam as Mylai Chieftain
 N. S. Krishnan as Papavinasam Chetty

Female cast
 U. R. Jeevarathnam as Poompavai
 K. R. Chellam as Ponnammal
 T. K. Pushpavalli as Mylai Chieftess
 A. R. Sakunthala as Majari
 T. A. Mathuram as Kamakshi

Dance
 V. S. Susheela Devi
 T. M. Papa
 A. R. Sakunthala
 M. J. Andal

Production 
Poompavai was based on the folk story of the girl of the same name. Produced by the Leo Films, it marked the directorial debut of the duo Krishnan–Panju (R. Krishnan and S. Panju) who were also in charge of the general supervision. But the director's credit was given to T. Balaji Singh instead. Besides co-directing, Panju also edited the film. The audiography was done by E. I. Jeeva. Purushotham was the cinematographer and the film was shot at Newtone Studios, Kilpauk. Kambadasan wrote the story while A. A. Somayajulu wrote the dialogue. V. B. Ramaiah Pillai and Nataraj were the dance choreographers.

Soundtrack 
The music was composed by Addepalli Rama Rao and the lyrics were written by Madurai Mariappa Swamigal and Kambadasan. Songs like "Kalam Veen Pogudhe" (sung by Jeevarathnam) and "Om Namasivayam" (sung by Ramaswamy) became popular.

Release and reception 
Poompavai was released on 11 August 1944 in select theatres, and had a wider release a week later. The film was distributed by Kandhan & Co in Coimbatore, Sri Chaya & Co in Madras, and Mysore Film Corporation in Bangalore, and emerged a box office success. Kay Yess Enn of The Indian Express positively reviewed the film, but criticised its length.

References

External links 

1940s Tamil-language films
1944 directorial debut films
1944 films
Films directed by Krishnan–Panju
Hindu devotional films
Hindu mythological films
Indian black-and-white films
Films scored by Addepalli Rama Rao